Yetkulsky District is an administrative and municipal district (raion), one of the twenty-seven in Chelyabinsk Oblast, Russia. It is located in the east of the oblast. Its administrative center is the rural locality (a selo) of Yetkul. Population:  30,165 (2002 Census);  The population of Yetkul accounts for 22.0% of the district's total population.

References

Notes

Sources

Districts of Chelyabinsk Oblast